William French was a tobacco merchant.

Early life 
French was born in 1732.

Career as a merchant 
As a tobacco merchant, French was involved in the Chesapeake trade, through multiple firms, including Spiers, Bowman & Co, in which French was a controlling partner. Alexander Spiers and John Bowman were his partners. The firm held stores along the James River.

His business was adversely affected by the disruption caused by the American War of Independence, and he was declared bankrupt in 1786.

He was one of the founder directors of the Glasgow Chamber of Commerce.

Politics 
French was provost of Glasgow between 1778 - 1780. He was also a Magistrate.

Property 
He owned the estate of Baillieston.

Death 
He was buried in the Ramshorn Cemetery, Glasgow, in 1832.

References 

1732 births
1803 deaths
Scottish merchants
People associated with Glasgow